Chełm is a village in the administrative district of Gmina Malczyce, within Środa Śląska County, Lower Silesian Voivodeship, in south-western Poland.

History
The area became part of the emerging Polish state in the 10th century. Centuries later it passed to Bohemia (Czechia), Prussia and Germany. It became again part of Poland following Germany's defeat in World War II in 1945.

Transport
The Voivodeship road 345 (road of regional importance) passes through Chełm, and the Polish A4 motorway runs nearby, southwest of the village.

References

Chelm